The Tirusulam Railway Station is one of the railway stations of the Chennai Beach–Chengalpattu section of the Chennai Suburban Railway Network. It serves the neighbourhood of Tirusulam, a suburb of Chennai where the city's airport is located.

History
The station lies in the Chennai Beach–Tambaram section of the Chennai Suburban Railway Network, the first suburban section of the city. With the completion of track-lying work in March 1931, which began in 1928, the suburban services were started on 11 May 1931 between Beach and Tambaram, and was electrified on 15 November 1931, with the first MG EMU services running on 1.5 kV DC. The section was converted to 25 kV AC traction on 15 January 1967.

Layout
The station has two suburban platforms and another island platform for long-distance mainline trains. Since mainline trains do not halt at the station, the island platform remains unused. The platform is 280 m long and has been considered to be extended to 575 m as there are plans to halt long-distance trains at the station.

Developments

The station is connected to the Chennai airport by means of a subway. Despite being situated at the entrance of the airport, the station does not cater to the needs of the air travellers due to the lack of proper approach corridors and other facilities. With the modernisation of Chennai Airport in 2012, several renovation processes are underway in the station. There are also plans to connect the station with the Metro Rail Station at the airport.

See also

 Chennai Suburban Railway
 Railway stations in Chennai

References

External links
 Tirusulam railway station on IndiaRailInfo.com
 Local Train timings from/to Tirusulam

Stations of Chennai Suburban Railway
Railway stations in Chennai
Railway stations in Kanchipuram district
Airport railway stations in India